Graphic Packaging Holding Company is a Fortune 500 corporation based in Sandy Springs, Georgia, United States. It is a leading company in the design and manufacturing of packaging for commercial products. GPI manufactures paperboard and folding cartons for a wide range of popular consumer goods, particularly beverages and packaged food. The company operates mills in Middletown, OH, Kalamazoo and Battle Creek, Michigan, West Monroe, Louisiana, Augusta, Georgia , Texarkana, Texas and in Macon, Georgia, that use recycled municipal wastewater in the manufacture of food grade cardboard and coated paper board. Its President and Chief Executive Officer is Michael P. Doss.

References

External links

Companies listed on the New York Stock Exchange
Packaging companies of the United States
Manufacturing companies based in Georgia (U.S. state)
Companies based in Sandy Springs, Georgia